Saudi Readymix Concrete Company Ltd. is a producer and supplier of ready-mix concrete and related products in Saudi Arabia. The company is based in Khobar, Saudi Arabia, operates 20 commercial and 10 on-site factories, and is involved in many projects all over the Kingdom.

As of 2008, Saudi Readymix grew to a work force of over 2,500 employees (2,900+ as of June 18, 2011), reached production of over 5,000,000 m3 of concrete a year, amassed a fleet of more than 400 mixer trucks some of which are GPS equipped, 150 mobile and stationary pumps and 3 aggregate quarries.

History
Saudi Readymix Concrete Company Ltd. was founded in 1978. Production began with the establishment of the company’s first factory, located in Saihat, Saudi Arabia, and continued and expanded its operations with the establishment of two on-site factories, one in each of Abqaiq and Jubail, Saudi Arabia.

Over the next 20 years, Saudi Readymix continued to grow in size and production by opening a block plant in Jubail, a ready-mixed concrete factory in the 1st industrial City in Dammam, factories outside of the Eastern Province in each of Riyadh and Jeddah, and acquiring its first quarry in Abu Hadriyah (more than 134 km NW of Dammam)

In 1998, Saudi Readymix Concrete Company Ltd. merged with Inma Construction Materials Co. Ltd. and became a wholly owned subsidiary of Khalid Ali Alturki & Sons' group of companies (better known as Alturki).

Professional affiliations
Saudi Readymix is affiliated with the following entities through accreditation by, cooperation with or, simply, by practicing the guidelines of:
Occupational Safety and Health Administration (OSHA)
American Society for Testing and Materials (ASTM)
American Concrete Institute (ACI)
British Standards Institution (BSI)
German Standards Institute (DIN)
US National Ready Mixed Concrete Association (NRMCA)
Pennsylvania Concrete Association
US Portland Cement Association
UK Construction Industry Research and Information Association (CIRIA)
UK Concrete Society
Saudi Aramco Research Laboratory
King Fahd University of Petroleum and Minerals Research Laboratory

Achievements, records and awards
Saudi Readymix Concrete Company Ltd. has accomplished several achievements, broke local records and is accredited with several awards:

Recognized as one of the best Saudi companies to work for.

Two time recipient of Saudi fast growth.

Listed and ranked as one of top 100 Saudi companies for six years in a row.
One of the companies mentioned and ranked 33rd for first participation in 2011.

Produces over 5,000,000 m3 of concrete a year.

Paved the largest concrete pour in Saudi Arabia.
Set up of biggest on-site concrete production facility in Saudi Arabia at KAUST.

References

External links 
 Saudi Readymix's Homepage
 Alturki Group's Homepage
 Best Saudi Company to Work For
 Saudi Fast Growth 100
 Top 100 Saudi Companies
 Saudi ReadyMix, Jeddah, Saudi Arabia

1978 establishments in Saudi Arabia
Companies of Saudi Arabia
Companies based in Khobar
Manufacturing companies of Saudi Arabia
Manufacturing companies established in 1978
Saudi Arabian brands